Cajun Field  is a football stadium located on the South Campus of the University of Louisiana at Lafayette in the city of Lafayette, Louisiana. Nicknamed The Swamp, it is the home field of Louisiana Ragin' Cajuns athletics. Cajun Field is primarily used for its American football team. Cajun Field has an official capacity of 41,426 with 2,577 chairback seats.

It is currently the largest facility and football stadium in the Sun Belt Conference and the second largest college football stadium in Louisiana.

History
In planning since at least 1967 (when a rendition was featured on the football media guide), it was built in 1970 as a replacement for McNaspy Stadium, opening on September 25, 1971 with a shutout of Santa Clara University.  The stadium consists of a bowl with seating on the sidelines, with a second deck on the west sideline.  In one of the biggest games at the stadium, on September 14, 1996, 38,783 spectators saw the Cajuns upset 25th-ranked Texas A&M, 29–22, the first victory for the Cajuns over a ranked opponent. The largest crowd at The Swamp  was 41,357 fans on September 5, 2009, when the Cajuns beat Southern University 42–19 at the 9th annual Herbert Heymann Football Classic.

The stadium won the Sun Belt Conference Attendance Championship in 2004, 2008, and 2011.

Because of Hurricane Katrina, the 2005 New Orleans Bowl was played here instead of in New Orleans, with Southern Miss defeating Arkansas State, 31–19. Also the Tulane Green Wave football team used it for a home game in 2005 after being displaced by the hurricane.

In addition, Cajun Field hosted the final pre-season game of the New Orleans Breakers of the United States Football League on February 18, 1984, a 20–0 victory over the Memphis Showboats.

Facility upgrades

Updated seating
In 1992, Cajun Field saw the attendance rise from 26,000 to 31,000 due to an upgrade to the ends of the stadium seating.

Synthetic surface and banners
In the summer of 2008 Cajun Field replaced its long-standing natural grass with ProGrass, an artificial turf. The stadium was pressure-washed and repainted. Advertisements and banners reading "University of Louisiana at Lafayette," "Ragin' Cajuns," and "www.ragincajuns.com" also were installed around the black retaining wall that surrounds the field.

Athletics Master Plan
In spring 2014, construction of the south endzone seating began. This first phase project included bowling in the south endzone with new bleacher seating as well as concession and restroom facilities. This change has increased capacity to 41,426 and was completed for the 2014 season kickoff. Daktronics also installed a  HD screen in the north end zone, replacing the previous scoreboard.

Major Renovation and Name Update
In June 2021 a major renovation was announced.  The Our Lady of Lourdes Regional Medical Center has secured naming rights for the new facility to take the place of Cajun Field with a commitment to invest $15 million over 15 years. The facility will now be known as Cajun Field at Our Lady of Lourdes Stadium.

"The Swamp"

Cajun Field's surface is two feet below sea level in a natural bowl. With the below-sea level playing surface, a total of four  pumps and a sophisticated drainage system help keep the field in good playing condition even during the frequent south Louisiana rainstorms. The subsurface stadium requires many fans to walk down to their seats. Ragin' Cajuns football players and their opponents enter Cajun Field through a tunnel from the Louisiana athletics complex.

In 1988 the stadium was nicknamed "The Swamp," as then noted on stadium signage, in the school yearbook and, a year later, in the 1989 official Southwestern Louisiana sports media guide. The nickname is tied to the field's early 1970s construction, and even refers to the original football field for what was then the Southwestern Louisiana Industrial Institute in the early 1900s.  The university's first football field was on the main campus adjacent to a small cypress pond, which later became Cypress Lake, also nicknamed The Swamp.

The "Swamp" nickname also fits with the area's geography, with many bayous and wetlands, including the Atchafalaya Basin and the nearby Gulf of Mexico marshlands. The National Wetlands Research Center, a United States Geological Survey research facility at the University of Louisiana at Lafayette, is less than half a mile from Cajun Field.

Division I FBS Ben Hill Griffin Stadium at the University of Florida was later also nicknamed "The Swamp" by then-Gators head coach Steve Spurrier in 1991.

Attendance records
Rankings come from AP poll

Gallery

See also
List of NCAA Division I FBS football stadiums
List of soccer stadiums in the United States

References

External links
 Official website

American football venues in Louisiana
College football venues
College soccer venues in the United States
NCAA bowl game venues
Louisiana Ragin' Cajuns football venues
Lacrosse venues in Louisiana
Soccer venues in Louisiana
University of Louisiana at Lafayette
Buildings and structures in Lafayette, Louisiana
Sports venues in Lafayette, Louisiana